Erucius magnificus is a species of 'monkey grasshopper' in the family Chorotypidae, with no subspecies listed in the Catalogue of Life. The type locality was in Borneo (Labuan Is.) and current records also include Vietnam.

References

Caelifera
Insects of Southeast Asia
Insects described in 1904